Abakshino is a rural locality (a village) in Mayskoye Rural Settlement of Vologodsky District, Vologda Oblast, Russia. The population was 120 as of 2002. There are 4 streets.

Geography 
The village is located on the left bank of the Vologda River, 17 km northwest of Vologda (the district's administrative centre) by road. Molbishcha is the nearest rural locality.

References 

Rural localities in Vologodsky District